Riverside is an unincorporated community in western Roanoke County, Virginia, United States.  The community lies along the Roanoke River near Dixie Caverns along U.S. 11/U.S. 460. The area is more commonly referred to as Dixie Caverns instead of Riverside.

References

Unincorporated communities in Roanoke County, Virginia
Unincorporated communities in Virginia